A wallet is a small, flat case that can be used to carry personal items.

Wallet or The Wallet may also refer to:

Arts, entertainment, and media

Literature
"Al-Mahfaza" ("The Wallet"), a story by Yusuf Idris
The Wallet of Kai Lung, a collection of fantasy stories by Ernest Bramah  1900
The Wallet of Time, a publication by William Winter, in two volumes 1913

Motion pictures
The Wallet (film), British film 1952, released as Blueprint for Danger in the US
"The Wallet" (Seinfeld)
"The Wallet", an episode of the Maude TV series, 1974

Music
"Wallet", by Plaid from Reachy Prints
"Wallet", a song by Regina Spektor from Far
The Wallets, a band from the Twin Cities 1980s

Electronic commerce
 Apple Wallet, a mobile app included with the Apple iOS operating system
 Crypto wallet, a digital wallet where private keys are stored for cryptocurrencies like Bitcoin
 Digital wallet, an electronic device or online service that allows an individual to make electronic or online payment transactions
 Google Wallet, a peer-to-peer payments service developed by Google
 Microsoft Wallet, a mobile payment and digital wallet service by Microsoft 
 Online wallet, an online service that allows an individual to make online payment transactions

See also
Wallet sciatica